Beacon Hill, Hampshire in England may refer to:

 Beacon Hill, Burghclere, Hampshire
 Beacon Hill, Warnford, Hampshire

See also
 Beacon Hill (disambiguation)